Cryptophasa hyalinopa is a moth of the family Xyloryctidae. It is known from Queensland, Australia.

Description
The wingspan is about 30 mm for males and about 66 mm for females. Head, palpi, thorax, and legs fleshy-ochreous, head somewhat pinkish tinged, tarsi ringed with blackish. Antennae blackish, pectinations: 2. Abdomen blackish, second segment orange-red. Forewings elongate, moderate, costa, nearly straight, termen obliquely rounded; fleshy-ochreous, darker on basal third; a fine black dot in disc at one-third, a second at posterior extremity of cell, and a third obliquely below and before; two others on fold beyond middle; an obscure row of fine blackish dots along termen to anal angle, not reaching apex. Hindwings semi-hyaline (glassy), basal two-thirds black; cilia whitish becoming fuscous around anal angle. Underside of both wings with basal two-thirds densely black. The sexes of this species are very dissimilar in the hindwings, the male having the terminal half hyaline and the basal half black.

Biology
The larvae feed on Eucalyptus platyphylla. They bore in the stem of their host plant. Adults are on wing in September and October.

References

Cryptophasa
Moths described in 1901